Émilie Loit and Åsa Svensson were the defending champions, but had different outcomes. While Svensson did not compete this year, Loit teamed up with Marion Bartoli and reached the semifinals before losing to Olga Blahotová and Gabriela Navrátilová.

Lisa McShea and Milagros Sequera won the title, by defeating Blahotová and Navrátilová 2–6, 7–6(7–5), 6–4 in the final. It was the 2nd title for McShea and the 1st title for Sequera in their respective doubles careers. It was also the 1st title for the pair during this season.

Seeds

Draw

Draw

References
 Main and Qualifying Draws

2004 Abierto Mexicano Telcel
2004 WTA Tour